Lazare Maurice Sèhouéto (born April 18, 1963) is a Beninese politician. Under President Mathieu Kérékou, he served as Minister of Commerce, Industry, Community Development, and the Promotion of Employment from May 2001 to June 2003, and as Minister of Agriculture, Husbandry, and Fishing from June 2003 to February 2005. He was one of five Force Clé candidates elected to the National Assembly in the March 2003 parliamentary election. He was the candidate of the Movement for the People's Alternative in the March 2006 presidential election, taking sixth place with 2.04% of the vote. In the 2007 parliamentary election he was one of four Force Clé candidates to be elected.

References

Members of the National Assembly (Benin)
Living people
Government ministers of Benin
Key Force politicians
Movement for the People's Alternative politicians
1963 births
Candidates for President of Benin